KRJB (106.5 FM) is a radio station licensed to serve Ada, Minnesota.  The station is owned by R & J Broadcasting Inc. It airs a full-service Country music format.

The station was assigned the KRJB call letters by the Federal Communications Commission on October 19, 1987.

References

External links
KRJB official website

Radio stations in Minnesota
Country radio stations in the United States
Norman County, Minnesota
Radio stations established in 1987